Dumurer Phul is a 1978 Bangladeshi children's film starring Ilyas Kanchan, Bobita and Azad Rahman Shakil in lead roles. The film was directed,  produced and written by Subhash Dutta. Syed Hasan Imam plays the role of grandfather to the lead actor. The film earned Bangladesh National Film Awards in three categories.

Cast 
 Bobita - Nurse
 Ilyas Kanchan
 Azad Rahman Shakil - Ladu
 Syed Hasan Imam - Ladu's grandfather 
 Sirajul Islam

Music 
The film's music has been composed by Azad Rahman with lyrics penned by Gazi Mazharul Anwar.

Accolades 
4th Bangladesh National Film Awards
 Winner: Best Child Artist - Azad Rahman Shakil
 winner: Best Editing - Nurunabi 
 Winner: Best Art Direction - Mohiuddin Faruk

References

1978 films
Bengali-language Bangladeshi films
1970s Bengali-language films
Films directed by Subhash Dutta
Films scored by Azad Rahman